Verin may refer to:

Vérin, a city in France
Verín, a city in Spain
Verín (comarca), a comarca in Spain
Verrine (demon), a demon in Christian mythology
Verin (Dungeons & Dragons), a demon lord in the Dungeons & Dragons roleplaying game
Verin Mathwin Sedai, a fictional character in Robert Jordan's The Wheel of Time fantasy series